Gerd Becker (3 May 1940 in Eschwege, Germany – 10 January 2017) was a German chemist. 

He held a chair of inorganic chemistry at the University of Stuttgart. In 1974 he synthesized the first localized phosphaalkene.

Sources
Entry on Becker's death

External links
Homepage at the University of Stuttgart

1940 births
2017 deaths
People from Eschwege
20th-century German chemists
Academic staff of the University of Stuttgart
21st-century German chemists